Sphaeroniscidae is a family of crustaceans belonging to the order Isopoda.

Genera:
 Amazoniscus Lemos de Castro, 1967
 Circoniscus Pearse, 1917 	 
 Neosanfilippia Brian, 1957 	 
 Protosphaeroniscus Schmalfuss, 1980 	 
 Richardsoniscus Vandel, 1963 	 
 Scleropactes Budde-Lund, 1885 	 
 Sphaeroniscus Gerstäcker, 1854 	 
 Spherarmadillo Richardson, 1907

References

Isopoda